Procottus gotoi is a species of ray-finned fish belonging to the family Cottidae, the typical sculpins. It is endemic to Lake Baikal in Siberia. This species was first formally described in 2001 by Valentina Grigorievna Sideleva.

References

gotoi
Fish of Lake Baikal 
Fish described in 2001